Context-sensitive solutions (CSS) is a theoretical and practical approach to transportation decision-making and design that takes into consideration the communities and lands through which streets, roads, and highways pass ("the context"). The term is closely related to but distinguishable from context-sensitive design in that it asserts that all decisions in transportation planning, project development, operations, and maintenance should be responsive to the context in which these activities occur, not simply the design process. CSS seeks to balance the need to move vehicles efficiently and safely with other desirable outcomes, including historic preservation, environmental sustainability, and the creation of vital public spaces. In transit projects, CSS generally refers to context sensitive planning, design, and development around transit stations, also known as transit-oriented development.

Overview

In contrast to long-standing practices in transportation design that place primary importance on moving traffic (vehicular throughput), the CSS process emphasizes that transportation facilities should fit their physical settings and preserve scenic, aesthetic, historic and environmental resources, while maintaining safety and mobility. For instance, if a state highway that passes through a downtown main street, applying CSS principles would entail creating a street where the movement of vehicles does not impede pedestrian activity and sidewalk commerce, rather than a street that is simply widened and straightened to increase speed, capacity and mobility for vehicles as a singular transportation objective. CSS therefore includes principles for context-sensitive decision-making that place a high value on community input and consensus, and more technical principles of context sensitive design.

When CSS principles are applied to transportation projects, the process involves a much broader range of disciplines than traditional transportation design methods, which rely exclusively on the judgment of traffic engineers. CSS is a collaborative, interdisciplinary approach that involves everyone with a significant stake in the project, such as the residents, businesses and local institutions that will be affected by an intervention or a failure to address the transportation implications of development such as congestion. Rather than approaching these stakeholders at the tail end of the design process in an attempt to gain approval, CSS emphasizes the need to incorporate their feedback from the very outset of the planning and design development processes and during all subsequent stages of construction, operations and maintenance.

Qualities of a CSS project

The following list of qualities (developed at a 1998 conference for transportation planners called "Thinking Beyond the Pavement") describe the core goals of the CSS process.

The CSS process

This outline of the core steps in the CSS process was also developed at the "Thinking Beyond the Pavement" conference.

History

The initial guiding principles of CSS came out of the 1998 "Thinking Beyond the Pavement" conference as a means to describe and foster transportation projects that preserve and enhance the natural and built environments along with economic and social assets for neighborhoods they pass through. In 2003, the Federal Highway Administration announced that under one of its three Vital Few Objectives (Environmental Stewardship and Streamlining) they had a target goal of  achieving CSS integration within all state Departments of Transportation by September 2007.

The American Association of State Highway and Transportation Organizations (AASHTO) is now (fall 2006) developing strategic goals and objectives for CSS which it describes as a "fundamental change in the way we do business." One principal element of this change is the way transportation planners and engineers address speed. Historically, the speed at which a vehicle can safely travel through the landscape has been regarded as a primary goal of transportation planning since it shortens travel time, saves money (time is money), and improves driver convenience. However, CSS recognizes that designing a facility for the maximum safe speed that is economically feasible can be detrimental to other community goals, and even to vehicle passengers themselves. CSS recognizes that the goal of transportation is social and economic exchange, which cannot occur at high speeds. Instead, CSS attempts to identify, through a community-based process, a  "target speed" that promotes the optimum amount of social and economic exchange, with lowest environmental impacts, that is appropriate for the context. Thus, in cities, if higher vehicle speeds lower the amount of social exchange on a residential street (fewer friends, less street life etc.) then the street will be designed to encourage drivers to slow down so as not to reduce social exchange. In a similar manner, commercial streets will be designed to maximize commercial exchange and designed accordingly. In more rural areas where a primary goal is to move people and goods between human settlements, CSS can be compatible with much higher design speeds. Setting a target speed that is appropriate for the context, and then designing roads, highway and streets to make it difficult for drivers to exceed that target speed, is a central CSS principle and represents a fundamental shift in transportation planning practice.

See also

Transportation planning
Complete streets
Placemaking
New Urbanism
Transit-oriented development
Town meeting

Notes

References

Maryland State Highway Administration, Summary of Thinking Beyond the Pavement Conference, page 3

External links
Context Sensitive Solutions
Federal Transit Administration
Institute for Transportation Engineers (ITE)
National Association of City Transportation Officials (NACTO)
CSS Objective 
Performance Assessment
FHWA's CSS website
FHWA CSS Program Activities
CSS Network 
Transit Oriented Development
Reconnecting America's Center for Transit Oriented Development
AASHTO Center for Environmental Excellence 
Project for Public Spaces
AASHTO Center for Environmental Excellence: Context Sensitive Solutions 

Transportation planning
Urban planning
Road transport